In the 1986 Cameroonian Premier League season, 16 teams competed. Canon Yaoundé won the championship defeating Union Douala.

League standings

References
Cameroon 1986 - List of final tables (RSSSF)

Cam
Cam
1
Elite One seasons